Listen My Friends! The Best of Moby Grape is a compilation album by Moby Grape, released in 2007 by Columbia Records as part of its "Legacy" series. The title of the album is a reference to lyrics repeated in the song "Omaha" on the group's debut album.

History
The compilation was released in the year following a final judicial determination that the members of Moby Grape had a right to ownership of the band name and related royalties, rather than their former manager, Matthew Katz.  As noted rock music reviewer Richie Unterberger commented, "...almost every track is impressive, making a case for the band as one of the '60s outfit who most adeptly blended rock, folk, blues, and country with touches of psychedelia, also showing their post-1967 stuff (at least the best of it) to be sturdier than it is usually remembered as."

Track listing
"Hey Grandma"  (Miller, Stevenson)  – 2:46
"Mr. Blues" (Mosley)  – 2:01
"8:05" (Miller, Stevenson)  – 2:22
"Omaha" (Spence)  – 2:46
"Sitting by the Window" (Lewis)  – 2:46
"Indifference" (Spence)  – 4:16
"Bitter Wind" [Version One] (Mosley)  – 2:40
"Murder in My Heart for the Judge" (Miller, Stevenson)  – 3:00
"Can't Be So Bad" (Miller, Stevenson)  – 3:27
"He" (Lewis)  – 3:39
"Motorcycle Irene" (Spence)  – 2:26
"Rose Colored Eyes" (Mosley)  – 4:03
"Sweet Ride (Never Again)" (Lewis, Miller, Mosley, Spence, Stevenson) – 5:57
"Ooh Mama Ooh" (Miller, Stevenson)  – 2:30
"Ain't That a Shame" (Lewis, Miller, Stevenson) – 2:32
"If You Can't Learn from My Mistakes" (Lewis)  – 2:36
"Going Nowhere" (Miller, Stevenson)  – 2:05
"Seeing" (Spence)  – 3:47
"Changes, Circles Spinning" (Lewis)  – 2:27
"Truly Fine Citizen" (Dell'Ara)  – 2:48

Personnel
 Peter Lewis – rhythm guitar, vocals
 Bob Mosley – bass, vocals
 Jerry Miller – lead guitar, vocals
 Skip Spence – rhythm guitar, vocals
 Don Stevenson – drums, vocals

References

Moby Grape albums
2007 greatest hits albums
Columbia Records compilation albums